Dazastah is one of the MCs of the Perth, Western Australia-based hip-hop group Downsyde.

History
Dazastah (Darren Reutens) joined Downsyde when he met MCs Optamus (Scott Griffiths) and Dyna-mikes (Shahbaz Rind) at Leederville TAFE in the late 1990s. Dazastah is also a producer and as well as working on beats for Downsyde he has produced for interstate performers and is a prominent local producer, working on albums with Hunter and Clandestien. He is also a member of Western Australia hip hop crew, Syllabolix.

As well as the four studio albums he has been a part of with Downsyde, Dazastah produced his first album in 2002, Done DL with Hunter which featured many guest appearances from other Syllabolix Crew members. He played a large part in production of the Clandestien Album  Dynasty, and also worked on the Hilltop Hoods' breakthrough 2003 album, The Calling. Six tracks with Dazastah's involvement have been on the Australian hip hop compilations albums, Culture of Kings, two on volume one and four on volume two.

Discography

Downsyde
 Epinonimous - Syllaboliks (2000)
 Land of the Giants - Hydrofunk/Virgin (2003)
 When the Dust Settles - Obese (2004)
 All City - Illusive Records (2008)

Production

Hunter
 Done DL - Syllaboliks (2002) Tracks 1-10, 12-19

Clandestien
 Dynasty - Syllaboliks (2003) Tracks 1, 3, 10, 13, 15

MC Layla
 Heretik - Obese (2004)
 "Favourite Hour" - (2013)

Task Force & Pegasus
 12" Apostles - Obese (2002) Tracks B1-B2

Hilltop Hoods
 The Calling - Obese (2003) Tracks 3, 13

Drapht
 Pale Rider - Obese (2003)
 Who Am I - Obese (2005)

Mystro
 Who You Gonna Blame - Grindin (2006)

Omni
 Batterie - NatAural High Records (2007) Tracks B1-B3

Guest appearances

 2001: "A.T.O.M.S" (from Clandestien album Clandestien)
 2003: "Front Line" (from Drapht album Pale Rider)
 2005: "Sugar Trails" (from MC Layla album Heretik)
 2005: "Muiltiple Choice" (from MC Layla album Heretik)
 2005: "Ya Think" (from Drapht album Who Am I)
 2005: "Wet T-Shirts" (from Drapht album Who Am I)
 2005: "Inspiration Island" (from Drapht album Who Am I)
 2005: "Dusty Fingers" (from Fdel album Audiofdelity)
 2007: "Game Over" (from Bias B album Been There Done That)
 2008: "Rest In Peace" (from Drapht album Brothers Grimm)

Awards
All listed for Downsyde.
 2003 Australian Dance Music Awards - Nominee - Best Hip-Hop act
 2003 Australian Dance Music Awards - Winner - Best Debut Artist
 2003 Australian Dance Music Awards - Nominee - Best Album - Land of the Giants
 2003 Australian Dance Music Awards - Nominee - Best Single - "Gifted Life"
 2003 Australian Dance Music Awards - Nominee - Best Australian Hip Hop Act
 2003 WAMi Awards - Winner - Most Popular Local Original Urban Music Act
 2003 WAMi Awards - Winner - Most Popular Local Original Music Video - "El Questro"
 2003 WAMi Awards - Winner - Most Popular Original Local Album - Land of the Giants
 2005 WAMi Awards - Winner - Best Live Electronic Act
 2005 WAMi Awards - Winner - Best Urban Music Act
 2006 WAMi Awards - Winner - Best Urban Music Act
 2007 WAMi Awards - Winner - Best Urban Music / Hip Hop Act
 2008 WAMi Awards - Winner - Best Urban Music / Hip Hop Act

References

External links
Downsyde's official website
Dazastah Myspace page
Dazastah Discogs page

Australian hip hop musicians
Living people
Rappers from Perth, Western Australia
Year of birth missing (living people)